Callum Anthony Howe (born 9 April 1994) is an English professional footballer who plays as a defender for  side Solihull Moors.

He began his career at Scunthorpe United, turning professional in 2012. He spent three years at the club without making a first-team appearance, and instead enjoyed loan spells at Bradford Park Avenue, Frickley Athletic, Gainsborough Trinity, Gateshead and Alfreton Town. He was named as Frickley Athletic's Player of the Season for 2012–13. He signed with Lincoln City in July 2015, and had loan spells at Southport and Eastleigh, before helping Lincoln to win the National League title in 2016–17. He was sold on to Port Vale in January 2018, before moving on to Harrogate Town four months later. He was sold on to Solihull Moors for an undisclosed fee in July 2019 and was named on the 2019–20 National League Team of the Year.

Career

Scunthorpe United
Howe began his career at Scunthorpe United, and was the only youth-team player to be offered a professional contract by manager Alan Knill in 2012. On 3 December 2012, he joined Conference North side Bradford Park Avenue on a one-month loan. He made his first-team debut for the Avenue 12 days later in a 2–0 defeat at Worcester City. He made one further appearance before his loan spell at Horsfall Stadium came to an end. On 15 February 2013, he joined Frickley Athletic of the Northern Premier League Premier Division on a one-month loan; a colony of former Scunthorpe players were already at the club, including Terry Barwick, Joe Wilcox, Jake Picton and Tom Johnstone. United manager Brian Laws said that "I believe he will gain a lot of experience by going into the non-league system and playing some games". He impressed at the "Blues" so much as to win the club's Player of the Season award despite only arriving in the second half of the 2012–13 season.

On 22 November 2013, he returned to the Conference North after joining Gainsborough Trinity on a one-month loan deal, where fellow "Iron" player Jamie Wootton was also on loan. The next day he scored on his debut in a 2–0 victory at Colwyn Bay. His loan at The Northolme was extended until the end of the 2013–14 season. He played a total of 24 games for Steve Housham's "Holy Blues", scoring two goals. He signed a new one-year contract with Scunthorpe in May 2014 after reportedly being highly rated by manager Russ Wilcox.

On 10 October 2014, he joined Gateshead of the Conference Premier on a one-month loan. He joined the "Tynesiders" after manager Gary Mills lost James Curtis due to injury. The following day he was declared a hero on his "Heed" debut after scoring the equalising goal in a 1–1 draw at Forest Green Rovers, which stretched the club's unbeaten run to nine games. However he only featured in one further game at the Gateshead International Stadium before his loan spell ended. On 16 January 2015, he joined Conference Premier side Alfreton Town on a three-month loan deal. He featured in 13 games for Nicky Law's "Reds", and scored one goal in a 4–2 win over Southport at North Street on 7 February. He was released by Scunthorpe at the end of the season.

Lincoln City
On 15 July 2015, Howe signed a one-year contract with Lincoln City after impressing manager Chris Moyses on trial. He became a first-team regular at Sincil Bank during the 2015–16 season, making 31 appearances. On 25 August 2016, he joined Southport on a one-month loan after "Sandgrounders" defender Chris Doyle picked up a long-term knee injury. He played 18 games for Steve Burr's Southport, and after returning to Lincoln he went on to feature 13 times in the latter half of the 2016–17 season as the club regained promotion to the English Football League after finishing as champions of the National League.

In June 2017 he signed a 12-month contract extension with Lincoln. However "Imps" manager Danny Cowley stated that he was happy with the centre-back options in Luke Waterfall, Sean Raggett, Robert Dickie and Michael Bostwick, so would look to loan Howe out so that he could find first-team football elsewhere. On 15 August 2017, he joined National League side Eastleigh on a five-month loan deal, with the "Spitfires" missing both Réda Johnson and Ryan Cresswell due to injury. Manager Richard Hill said that: "I've known Callum and been a big admirer of his for quite a while, he and [centre-back] Boycey played together at Scunthorpe – in fact they're best mates". He went on to serve as club captain, scoring four goals in 28 matches, and upon being recalled by Lincoln in January, Eastleigh boss Andy Hessenthaler said that "he's been great, in the last couple of weeks especially".

Port Vale
On 31 January 2018, Howe joined Port Vale for an undisclosed fee, signing an 18-month contract. Manager Neil Aspin had also signed centre-backs Charlie Raglan and Kyle Howkins on loan earlier in the day. He was transfer-listed at the end of the 2017–18 season after making just three appearances for the "Valiants".

Harrogate Town
On 25 May 2018, Howe was sold on to National League newcomers Harrogate Town for a "small fee". He scored nine goals from 48 appearances during the 2018–19 season, helping Simon Weaver's Town to reach the play-offs, were they were beaten 3–1 at AFC Fylde at the quarter-final stage. He was named as Harrogate's Players' Player of the Season.

Solihull Moors
On 27 July 2019, Howe signed a three-year contract with National League side Solihull Moors after moving for an undisclosed fee that was reported to be a Harrogate club record. He scored six goals in 45 appearances in the 2019–20 season, which was permanently suspended on 26 March due to the COVID-19 pandemic in England, with Moors in eighth-place. He was named on the National League Team of the Year, along with centre-back partner Alex Gudger. A knee injury restricted him to just five appearances in the 2020–21 campaign. He was given a two-year contract extension by manager Neal Ardley after returning to full fitness from hip surgery. He played 32 league games in the 2021–22 season and went on to score in the 3–1 play-off semi-final victory over Chesterfield at Damson Park. He played at the London Stadium in the play-off final, which ended in a 2–1 defeat to Grimsby Town after extra time.

Style of play
Howe is a central defender with good aerial ability in both boxes.

Career statistics

Honours
Lincoln City
National League: 2016–17

Individual
Frickley Athletic Player of the Season: 2012–13
National League Team of the Year: 2019–20

References

1994 births
Living people
Footballers from Doncaster
English footballers
Association football defenders
Scunthorpe United F.C. players
Bradford (Park Avenue) A.F.C. players
Frickley Athletic F.C. players
Gainsborough Trinity F.C. players
Gateshead F.C. players
Alfreton Town F.C. players
Lincoln City F.C. players
Southport F.C. players
Eastleigh F.C. players
Port Vale F.C. players
Harrogate Town A.F.C. players
Solihull Moors F.C. players
National League (English football) players
Northern Premier League players
English Football League players